HMVS Nepean was a second-class torpedo boat constructed for the Victorian Naval Forces and later operated by the Commonwealth Naval Forces and the Royal Australian Navy. She was sunk on mud flats on Swan Island in Port Phillip Bay in 1912 after being stripped of equipment and machinery.

Design and construction
Nepean was one of several torpedo boats ordered by the government of Victoria in 1882 to protect the colony from a possible Russian or French attack, and was built by John I. Thornycroft & Company, Chiswick.

She was designed with a low freeboard, to minimise her profile.

Operational history

Fate
She was sunk on mud flats on Swan Island in Port Phillip Bay in 1912 after being stripped of equipment and machinery.

References

Lonsdale-class torpedo boats
1882 ships
Ships built in Chiswick
Ships built by John I. Thornycroft & Company